Cooke-Sasseville is a contemporary artistic duo created in Québec City in 2000 by Jean-François Cooke (born 1974, in Chicoutimi, QC) and Pierre Sasseville (born 1978, in Quebec City, QC). Their main mediums are sculpture and installations.

Biography 
Well-known in the Québec art scene, this critically acclaimed duo has participated in major exhibitions, events and residencies in Québec, Mexico and Europe. With past successes including participations in important group shows such as the first Québec Triennial (Nothing is Lost, Nothing is Created, Everything is Transformed, Musée d’art contemporain de Montréal, 2008), as well as the 2010 instalment of Manif d’art, the Québec City biennial (curated by the editor in chief of the award-winning international contemporary art magazine Art Papers, Sylvie Fortin). Through irony and absurdity, they deal with various subjects such as religion, sexuality, politics or the art world.

Artwork

Artistic Process 
Cooke-Sasseville have experimented with various materials including, aluminum, bronze, stainless steel, concrete, electrostatic paint, chemical anchoring and lighting systems. The elements composing their diverse works belong to the common and mundane, easily identifyable by the viewer. Animals, especially deer, are a common sight in their work. For their public pieces, they have worked in collaboration with project management teams, architects, landscape architects and engineers, sometimes even hiring a project manager to assist them with communication and logistics aspects. When talking about their approach, Anne-Marie Bouchard, Curator of modern art at the Musée national des beaux-arts du Québec, says: "Cooke-Sasseville demonstrate a continuous engagement with more accessible codes of Western culture. While at times playing the game of beautifying and decorating the architectural landscape, the public artworks of Cooke-Sasseville nevertheless aim to showcase the structural character of public institutions. Combining humour and popular imagery, Cooke-Sasseville’s works stand as true testimony to art’s capacity to interact with different spheres of urban life."

Public Art 
CIRCULATION, 2015: This two-part sculpture is located at the Grandview Heights Aquatic Centre. Pipes, inspired by the ones of the pool, are painted red and blue to represent bloodflow. On the west side of the Centre, a fawn is drinking from a faucet attached to the pipes. On the northern side, several water-like deers emerge from other pipes, implying that the sculptures are connecting somewhere under the building. These elements reflect the Aquatic Centre's roles as both a place of leisure and competition, the fawn symbolizing youth and play, while the deer symbolizing adulthood and sport. Their imaginary link implies that work and play are both components of a healthy lifestyle.

SUIVRE SON COURS, 2017: A lead pencil is attached by zip-tie to a dandelion, potentially representing education acting as a tutor for a growing flower.

LA RENCONTRE, 2017: Probably one of their most well-known sculpture, these two stags facing each other evoke themes of balance, reflection, confrontation, and nordicity. Installed in front on Place Jean-Béliveau, right in front of Centre Videotron, the pair engages once again with the location's purpose, merely the encounter with oneself, the encounter with others, the face-to-face, the search for balance experienced in a busy and festive environment.

LES GARDIENS, 2018: The human eye is intimately linked to the lighthouse in popular imagery since together they suggest the paradoxical idea of seeing and being seen. Installed on a huge colourful steel pipe that seems to come out of the ground, this gigantic eyeball adorned with a sailor's hat turns on itself. It is thus having a panoramic view of the surrounding environment.

MIGRATION, 2018: Through a set of scales and shapes, this sculptural installation connects two emblematic symbols of Canada: the goose and the wheat sheaf. Geese live throughout the territory and symbolize community life, strength of the group, and migration. As for the sheaf of wheat, it illustrates the importance of agriculture in the economic and social development of the country.

BATTRE LE SENTIER, 2021: Installed at Zoo sauvage de Saint-Félicien, the artwork depicts colorful deer defying gravity on a metal pole, a call back to the zoo's surrounding fauna and flora.

Gallery Works

Exhibitions 

 2000 – Exercice de consommation, évènement Vie-trine, Saguenay, QC.
 2001 – Le Buisson ardant, Rouje - Arts et événements, Quebec Cty, QC.
 2002 – 256 pieds carrés de bonheur, événement Artbord, Saguenay, QC.
 2002 – Sacré Cerveau, Rouje - Arts et événements, Quebec City, QC.
 2003 – Le Boggie, évènement Kits de manifestation, Folie/Culture, Quebec City, QC.
 2003 – L'Envie, Manif d'art 2, Quebec City, QC.
 2003 – Le Mur des Lamentations, Centre d'artiste Langage Plus, Alma, QC.
 2004 – La Famille Élargie, 8e édition du Festival de théâtre de rue de Shawinigan, QC.
 2004 – La Vache perdue, exposition indépendante Massacre à la scie, Quebec City, QC.
 2004 – La ville aux animaux, esplanade de la Place des Arts, Montréal, QC.
 2005 – Cooke-Sasseville, Demi-Dieux, événement Créer avec un artiste, Musée national des beaux-arts du Québec, Quebec City, QC.
 2005 – Silence, on coule, exposition C'est arrivé près de chez vous, Musée national des beaux-arts du Québec, Quebec City, QC.
 2005 – Zone de défoulement divin, Urbaine urbanité III, Parc Saint-Aloysius, Montreal. QC.
 2005 – Le Plus beau jour de ma vie, Centre d'art Skol, Montréal ; L'Œil de Poisson, Quebec City, QC.
 2006 – Vous faites pitié à voir, Centre d'art Skol, Montréal; Rouje - Art et événements, Quebec City, QC.
 2006 – Vous pensez trop, n'y pensez pas, Espace Virtuel, Saguenay, QC.
 2006 – Allée simple, Journées de la culture, Parc des Champs-de-Bataille, Quebec City, QC.
 2006 – Aux pieds la tête, Espace Virtuel, Saguenay, QC.
 2006 – Le Nouveau Monde, Orange - L’événement d’art actuel de Saint-Hyacinthe, QC.
 2008 – Les Domestiques, Repérage, Collection Loto-Québec, Manif d'art 4, Quebec City, QC.
 2008 – Victoire sur la banane, Québec Gold - Palais du Tau (Reims), France.
 2008 – Jeu de blocs, Musée d'art contemporain de Montréal
 2008 – Dérapage et Rire Jaune, Musée de la civilisation, Quebec, QC.
 2008 – Parlez-en à votre médecin, Salon des métiers d'art de Montreal, QC.
 2008 – Si j'avais su…, Plein Sud, Longueuil, QC.
 2010 – Le Petit gâteau d'or, Art Mûr, Montreal, QC.
 2010 – Mourir enfin, Manif d'art 5, Quebec City, QC.
 2010 – Série LVG (Lunette Van Gogh), Art Mûr, Montreal, QC.
 2010 – La Vie en rose, Centre d'artiste Regart, Lévis; Art Souterrain, Montreal, QC.
 2013 – Cooke-Sasseville: Patrimoine bâti, Art Mûr, Montreal, QC.

References 

Sculptors from Quebec